Spilonota eremitana, the larch leafroller, is a moth of the family Tortricidae. It is found in Japan (Hokkaido, Honshu), China (Heilongjiang, Anhui, Henan, Hubei, Guizhou), Russia and the Korean Peninsula.

Its wingspan is 11–15 mm.

The larvae feed on Larix leptolepis, Larix dahurica var. japonica, Larix dahurica var. olgensis and Larix decidua. It is considered an important pest of larch. Trees are completely defoliated when outbreaks occur.

References

External links
Eurasian Tortricidae

Eucosmini
Insects of Korea
Moths described in 1972
Moths of Japan